Lixin may refer to:

Lixin County, Anhui, China
Shanghai Lixin University of Accounting and Finance
Lai Sun (Lixin), Hong Kong conglomerate

See also
Lai Sun (disambiguation), or Lixin in pinyin